KFTA may refer to:

 KFTA-TV, a television station (channel 27) licensed to Fort Smith, Arkansas, United States
 KKRK, a radio station (970 AM) licensed to Rupert, Idaho, United States, which held the call sign KFTA from 2000 to 2014
 The Korean Federation of Teachers' Associations, the largest teachers' union in South Korea